Mun Min-hee (born 7 July 1995) is a South Korean weightlifter. She won the bronze medal in the women's 75 kg event at the 2018 Asian Games held in Jakarta, Indonesia.

In 2018, she competed in the women's 81 kg event at the World Weightlifting Championships held in Ashgabat, Turkmenistan. She finished in 10th place.

References 

Living people
1995 births
Place of birth missing (living people)
South Korean female weightlifters
Weightlifters at the 2018 Asian Games
Asian Games medalists in weightlifting
Medalists at the 2018 Asian Games
Asian Games bronze medalists for South Korea
21st-century South Korean women